The 2001 Catalan motorcycle Grand Prix was the sixth round of the 2001 Grand Prix motorcycle racing season. It took place on the weekend of 15–17 June 2001 at the Circuit de Catalunya. 84,000 people attended the race.

500 cc classification

250 cc classification

125 cc classification

Championship standings after the race (500cc)

Below are the standings for the top five riders and constructors after round seven has concluded.

Riders' Championship standings

Constructors' Championship standings

 Note: Only the top five positions are included for both sets of standings.

References

Catalan motorcycle Grand Prix
Catalan
Catalan Motorcycle Grand Prix
motorcycle